DXFE (99.3 FM), broadcasting as 99.3 Yes The Best, is a radio station owned and operated by Manila Broadcasting Company though its licensee, Pacific Broadcasting Systems. The station's studio and transmitter are located at the 4th Floor, BH Building, Sabayle St., Brgy. Saray, Iligan. It operates daily from 4:00 AM to 12:00 MN.

History
The station started its broadcast on February 4, 2002, as Yes FM. Back then, it was on 105.5 MHz under the callsign DXTL. In 2012, it went off the air after a fire incident in the building it was in, damaging the station's equipment, transmitter and studio.

On May 15, 2017, following the launching of The New Face of YES!, the station returned on air as Yes The Best, this time on 99.3 MHz under the callsign DXFE.

References

Radio stations in Iligan
Adult contemporary radio stations in the Philippines
Radio stations established in 2002
Pacific Broadcasting Systems stations